Beef: The Series is a television series that aired on Black Entertainment Television (BET). The show premiered on October 4, 2006, and aired six episodes for the first season, with the last original episode airing on November 8, 2006. Due to the lack of numbers in ratings, BET did not continue the Beef series.

Based on the popular documentary series that premiered on DVD starting in 2003 (which spawned two sequels, each in 2004 and 2005), this current series explores arguments and feuds in the hip-hop genre and beyond. Those also include personal conflicts between those in both the sports and entertainment worlds, as well politics. DeRay Davis is featured in wraparound segments, speaking with ordinary people about who would they "beef" with when it comes to personal conflict.

The show is executive produced by Quincy D. Jones III (QD3).

See also
 Beef (documentary)
 Beef II
 Beef III
 Beef IV

External links
 
 

Hip hop television
BET original programming
2006 American television series debuts
2006 American television series endings